The warforged are one of the playable fictional races of creatures in the Eberron campaign setting of the Dungeons & Dragons fantasy role-playing game.

Publication history
The warforged first appeared in third edition for the Eberron setting as a player character race in the Eberron Campaign Setting (2004), which also introduced the warforged titan. The warforged appeared again as a player character race in Monster Manual III (2004), which introduced the warforged charger and the warforged scout. The warforged appeared once more as a player character race for the Eberron setting in Races of Eberron (2005). The psiforged appeared in Magic of Eberron (2005). The warforged scorpion and the quorcraft wargorged template appeared in Secrets of Xen'drik (2006). The raptor warforged appeared in Forge of War (2007).

Description
The warforged are a race of living, sentient constructs, superficially similar to golems. Warforged are composed of a blend of materials: predominantly stone, wood, and some type of metal. In Eberron, they were created by House Cannith in magical 'creation forges' to fight in the Last War, based on technology recovered from Xen'drik. When the Last War ended, they were given their freedom at the Treaty of Thronehold. Though they have free will, whether they have a soul is not known with certainty; they can be resurrected by spells designed to restore human souls to life, but, unlike humans, never remember anything of their experience in the afterlife after such an event.

While they have no sex, warforged may adopt a gender role as part of their individual personality. They do not age as the other races do, and it is not known what effects time will have on them. It is stipulated that, like all living creatures, their bodies must experience degradation over time. Like other races, warforged may take levels in any character class.

Racial qualities and adjustments of the warforged were published in the Eberron Campaign Setting and later reprinted in Monster Manual III. Warforged are produced with their own armor and have various immunities, including to poison and disease.  Healing spells have reduced effect on warforged, but a series of repair spells work fully on them. Other published forms of warforged include:

 warforged charger (MM3) – warforged that are larger than standard designed for brute strength, but have little intelligence.
 warforged scout (MM3) – Smaller versions of the traditional warforged.
 warforged titan (ECS) – warforged that are larger and stronger than chargers, but are even less intelligent.

History of the warforged

Warforged in Xen'drik
The origins of the warforged on Eberron are not clear. According to a "docent" (ancient and sentient memory-containing magic item) found in Secrets of Xen'drik, the very first warforged were created as "host bodies" for a group of Quori (which were very different from Quori of 998 YK). The giants of Xen'drik created their own versions for their wars against the Quori, because the warforged are immune to many Quori tactics. However, according to Tales of the Last War, the giants invented the warforged, after which the Quori stole the secrets of their creation from the dreams of giants and created their own.

Either way, the secrets of warforged creation seem to have originated on the continent of Xen'drik. The ability of ancient Xen'drik docents to meld with modern-day warforged supports this theory. The existence of Xulo, a huge and powerful warforged found in Xen'drik, also supports this theory.

Warforged in Khorvaire
Near the halfway point of the Last War, Merrix d'Cannith, of the Dragonmarked House Cannith, was commissioned to build a great army of golems, to serve as untiring warriors. Not satisfied with the lifeless, unintelligent hulks his forges produced, nor with the prohibitively expensive process of creating golems one-by-one, Merrix began experimenting with magic to instill some spark of life in them that would enable them, like living things, to direct their own actions and to be grown by a self-sustaining process. After many unsuccessful attempts, Merrix's son, Aarren d'Cannith, finally invented the process used in the creation forges.
The warforged that Aarren's creation forges created were fully sentient, with the ability to have emotions, relationships, even to experience death; each new generation increased in sophistication and intelligence, ranging from the barely-sentient titans to the youngest versions of warforged who were fully capable of achieving advanced education and ability in magic. However, Aarren and Merrix had a disagreement over their use. Aarren felt that House Cannith had created life, and refused to see his creations used as tools. Merrix ignored him, and Aarren, feeling powerless, left. Powerful divination magics used to this day have only been able to confirm that he is still alive, not where he is.
At the end of the War, two important rulings regarding the warforged came down:

  All warforged were declared 'people', and not possessions.
  The House Cannith creation forges were to be shut down, never to produce any more of the living constructs.

Despite the rulings, many warforged are still regarded as outsiders, and many are still employed as indentured servants.

There are also rumours that Merrix d'Cannith, (the grandson of the original Merrix) still produces illegal warforged in a lost creation forge. Even more disturbing are the rumors that the Lord of Blades, a rogue warforged, has stumbled onto an undestroyed creation forge in the Mournland and has begun creating an army.

The Lord of Blades, a figure of near-messianic significance to the warforged, took advantage of the Day of Mourning to establish an independent warforged outpost within the Mournland; operating from a philosophy that the existence of organic life will always pose a threat that his people will be returned to servitude, he wages a guerrilla war with the eventual goal the elimination of human dominance in Khorvaire; his agents thus serve as reliable antagonists for many Eberron campaigns. One of the biggest mysteries in the setting is the nature of the Lord of Blades' identity and to what extent he actually exists or has been mythologized.

Races of Eberron, an extended reference guide for the campaign setting, has much more in-depth material on warforged variations and additional feats and abilities. As well, it mentions the beginnings of the construction of the Godforged, which could in fact be a warforged god.

Recently a new group of warforged calling themselves the "Psiforged" have begun appearing across Eberron. Able to use very powerful psionic abilities, their origins are as much as mystery as their motives. Some are said to originate from Mournland, while others appear from deep beneath the depth of Sharn. House Cannith denies any connection to the new design and has stated that they never pursued a psionically enhanced warforged model.

Creative Origins
The warforged are very similar, in appearance, concept and history, to the War Golems of the comic Battle Chasers. The War Golems were also built to fight in a war and were also social outcasts after the conflict. Similarly, warforged bear many coincidental nuances in common with Nimblewrights, first mentioned in the Monster Manual II (MM2). Nimblewrights however, seem to not only possess self-awareness but also a larger majority of their initial construct designs, including many of immunities.

Warforged in Fourth Edition
As of the release of the 4th Edition Dungeons and Dragons Monster Manual in June 2008, Warforged became an official part of the core Points of Light Campaign Setting, and by extension an encouraged part of all campaign settings (such as Greyhawk, the previous core campaign setting, and The Forgotten Realms).

Reception
Mark Silcox and Jonathan Cox highlighted the roleplaying potential of warforged player characters in the book Dungeons and Dragons and Philosophy: Raiding the Temple of Wisdom. They wrote, "this new playable race turns many of the accepted tropes of traditional high fantasy storytelling on their heads, and presents the player with several possibilities for investigating interesting philosophical experiments. [...] Now these large bipedal meta-humans made of metal, leather, and fibrous joints have their own thoughts and (somewhat naive) emotions, but have no defined purpose within a world without an obvious war to fight".

Geek & Sundry wrote "Winner of Wizards of the Coast’s Fantasy Setting Search contest in 2002, Eberron marries magic with steampunk’s technology, offering a world of elemental-powered airships, industrial nobility, and arcane tinkerers. [...] I dig the playable Warforged race, which puts you in the mind of a soldier drone seeking purpose (although their explicit maleness serves a pedantic point). If you want to sling spells in a tailored coat, check out Eberron".

References

Additional reading
Polojac, John. "Arcane Upgrade: warforged Magic Items." Dragon #341 (Paizo, 2006).
Sehestedt, Mark, ed. Tales of the Last War. Renton, Washington: Wizards of the Coast, 2006. 

Wizards of the Coast – Dragonshards: The warforged, Part One
 Wizards of the Coast – Dragonshards: The warforged, Part Two
 Jhonen Olain's Eberron Journal – The World of Eberron: warforged

Dungeons & Dragons monsters
Eberron